That House We Lived In is a double live album by American experimental rock band Keep the Dog. It comprises material from their final European tour in 1991 and was released by Fred Frith on his own Fred Records in 2003.

Background
Keep the Dog (1989–1991) was Fred Frith's review band that performed live in Europe, North America and the former Soviet Union. Material for this album comes from DAT recordings of the band's final performances in Austria, Germany, and Italy in May and June 1991. Frith only considered releasing an album of their work in 2002 when Jon Leidecker spotted the tapes in Frith's office and volunteered to assemble a montage for review.

Frith arranged the tracks on the two CDs to "... re-create the feeling of a typical two-set concert while including as much of our repertoire as possible within the time constraints of the format." While the pieces represented a typical concert, they were in fact selected from some 20 different performances on their final tour.

Content
The tracks on That House We Lived In are primarily Frith compositions from about a dozen of his solo, group and project albums. All are free interpretations by the band of the originals, often leading to improvisation. These include "pop" tunes like "Some Clouds Do" from Cheap at Half the Price, "dance" numbers like "Rock and a Hard Place" from Allies, "Hola, On Danse!" from the rock opera, Dropera, and two of Frith's "classics": "Norrgården Nyvla" from Gravity, and "Domaine de Langendreer" (originally "Domaine de Planousset") from Speechless. Two versions of Massacre's "Bones" are here: a take on the original, and a slow number rendering it barely recognisable as "Bones". A few of the tracks are entirely improvised and do not appear elsewhere, like "Revelation" and "That Home We Lived In".

That House We Lived In is largely an instrumental album with the occasional vocal utterances from members of the group, and Frith singing the refrain "some clouds do, some clouds don't" on "Some Clouds Do".

Reception

In a review at AllMusic, François Couture wrote that That House We Lived In is "a must" for enthusiasts of Frith's "livelier, more vivacious writing". Highlight tracks for Couture included the "lively" "Hola, On Danse!", the "darker" "Propaganda Suite", the "mad rendition" of "Some Clouds Do", and the "beautiful" "Norrgården Nyvla".

Writing at Clouds and Clocks, Beppe Colli said that Keep the Dog plays Frith's material "with a freshness, assurance and creativity" that demonstrates how well the sextet work together. He praised the band's repertoire, adding that "[t]ime has been kind to these melodies and arrangements, which now sound 'classic. He spoke highly of Derome, Lussier and Parkins, but questioned Hayward's "limpid rhythm framework", and said Ostertag's sampler is "indispensable but not always easy to hear". Colli also questioned Frith's statement in the liner notes that he wanted to include as much as he could of the band's set "within the time constraints of the format" when another hour of music could have been accommodated on the double-CD.

Track listing

Original recordings
Most of the above tracks were adapted from original recordings by Fred Frith that appeared on the following albums:
Gravity (1980) by Fred Frith: "Norrgården Nyvla", "Year of the Monkey"
Killing Time (1981) by Massacre: "Bones", "No Legs", "Slow Bones"
Speechless (1981) by Fred Frith: "Domaine de Langendreer"
Who Needs Enemies? (1983) by Fred Frith and Henry Kaiser: "The Trace"
Cheap at Half the Price (1983) by Fred Frith: "Walking Song", "Some Clouds Do", "Instant Party"
The Country of Blinds (1986) by Skeleton Crew: "Foot in Hole"
The 20th Anniversary of the Summer of Love (1987) by various artists: "True Love"
The Technology of Tears (1988) by Fred Frith: "Propaganda Suite"
Step Across the Border (1990) by Fred Frith: "Candy Machine"
Invisible Means (1990) by French Frith Kaiser Thompson: "Lizard's Tail", "Quick Sign"
Dropera (1991) by Fred & Ferd (Fred Frith and Ferdinand Richard): "Hola, On Danse!"
Helter Skelter (1992) by Fred Frith and François-Michel Pesenti: "Dark as a Match"
Allies (1996) by Fred Frith: "Rock and a Hard Place", "Small Mercy II"

Performance venues
The tracks on That House We Lived In were taken from Keep the Dog's final European tour in May and June 1991, and performed at: 
Theater Am Kornmarkt, Bregenz, Austria
Elizabethenbuhne, Salzburg, Austria
Kulturzentrum Wolkenstein, Stainach, Austria
Bahnhof Langendreer, Bochum, Germany
Fabrik, Hamburg, Germany
Manufaktur, Shondorf, Germany
Teatro Dada, Castelfranco Emilia, Italy
Shocking Club, Milan, Italy
Verona, Italy

Personnel
Fred Frith – guitar, bass guitar, violin, voice
René Lussier – guitar, bass guitar
Jean Derome – alto saxophone, baritone saxophone, flute, guimbarde, voice
Zeena Parkins – accordion, electric harp, piano, synthesizer, voice
Charles Hayward – drums, found objects, melodica, voice
Bob Ostertag – sampling keyboard
Claudia Engelhart –  live sound mix, DAT recording

Production
Jon Leidecker – first montage and final cleanup
Fred Frith – producer
Peter Hardt – engineer
Myles Boisen – mastering
Edited and sequenced at Jankowski Studio, Esslingen, Germany, July 2002
Mastered at Headless Buddha Mastering Labs, Oakland, United States, March 2003

References

2003 debut albums
2003 live albums
Experimental music albums by American artists
Albums produced by Fred Frith
Fred Records live albums